Cambria is a populated place in Harford County, Maryland, northwest of Whiteford.

Many slate quarries were in operation to the southeast of Cambria in the 1800s.  The region was known as the Peach Bottom Slate area.

References

Unincorporated communities in Harford County, Maryland
Unincorporated communities in Maryland
Welsh-American culture in Maryland